New Gen Airways was the trading name for NewGen Airways Company Limited (formerly Sabaidee Airways Company Limited (Thai: บริษัท สบายดีแอร์เวย์ส จำกัด)), a Thai international airline that concentrated on flights from Thailand to China. It operated both scheduled- and non-scheduled (charter) services from 6 main Thailand hubs, Bangkok's Don Mueang International Airport, U-Tapao International Airport, Krabi International Airport, Phuket International Airport, Surat Thani International Airport and Nakhon Ratchasima Airport in the southern cities of Krabi, Phuket and Surat Thani, to a total of 30 destinations in China.

In August 2019, New Gen Airways suspended all flight operations. In October of the same year, the airline forfeited its whole fleet, thus ceasing all operations.

History
The airline received an air operator's certificate in January 2014.

Destinations

From Bangkok – Don Mueang International Airport (Primary Hub)
Changsha – Changsha Huanghua International Airport
Fuzhou – Fuzhou Changle International Airport
Guilin – Guilin Liangjiang International Airport
Guiyang – Guiyang Longdongbao International Airport
Hiroshima – Hiroshima Airport 
Hefei – Hefei International Airport 
Huai'an – Huai'an Lianshui Airport
Huangshan – Huangshan Tunxi International Airport
Jinan – Jinan Yaoqiang International Airport
Jinjiang – Quanzhou Jinjiang International Airport
Nanchang – Nanchang Changbei International Airport
Nanning – Nanning Wuxu International Airport
Ningbo – Ningbo Lishe International Airport
Wenzhou – Wenzhou Longwan International Airport
Wuxi – Sunan Shuofang International Airport
Xuzhou – Xuzhou Guanyin Airport
Zhangjiajie – Zhangjiajie Hehua Airport
Yiwu – Yiwu Airport

From Chiang Mai – Chiang Mai International Airport 
Ningbo – Ningbo Lishe International Airport 
Wenzhou – Wenzhou Longwan International Airport

From Krabi – Krabi Airport 
Jinan – Jinan Yaoqiang International Airport
Tianjin – Tianjin Binhai International Airport
Wuhan – Wuhan Tianhe International Airport
Changsha – Changsha Huanghua International Airport
Nanning – Nanning Wuxu International Airport

From Phuket – Phuket Airport
Baotou – Baotou Erliban Airport
Guiyang – Guiyang Longdongbao International Airport
Hangzhou – Hangzhou Xiaoshan International Airport
Wuxi – Sunan Shuofang International Airport
Hohhot – Hohhot Baita International Airport

From Pattaya – U-Tapao International Airport
Zhengzhou – Zhengzhou Xinzheng International Airport

Domestic Destinations
From Nakhon Ratchasima – Nakhon Ratchasima Airport (Hub)
Chiang Mai – Chiang Mai International Airport
Phuket – Phuket International Airport
Bangkok – Don Mueang International Airport

Former Destinations
Kunming – Kunming Wujiaba International Airport
Nanjing – Nanjing Lukou International Airport
Qingdao – Qingdao Liuting International Airport

Fleet 
As of June 2018 the New Gen Airways fleet consisted of the following aircraft

References

External links 

 

Defunct airlines of Thailand
Airlines established in 2012
Airlines disestablished in 2019
Thai companies established in 2012
2019 disestablishments in Thailand
Companies based in Bangkok